Ganekogorta or Belaute is a mountain in the border of the provinces of Biscay and Álava in the Basque Country, Spain. It is located roughly halfway between Bilbao and Llodio. It is the main peak of a massif that comprises some smaller mountains like Pagasarri, Ganeta, Pastorekorta, Arnotegi and Arraiz. The northern slopes of the massif reach the city of Bilbao.

References

External links 
 
 Ganekogorta at the Mendikat website 

Mountains of Álava
Mountains of Biscay
Mountains of the Basque Country (autonomous community)